Ryabovo is a rural locality (a village) in Yugskoye Rural Settlement, Cherepovetsky District, Vologda Oblast, Russia. The population was 49 as of 2002.

Geography 
Seltso-Ryabovo is the nearest locality. etimologia

References 

Rural localities in Cherepovetsky District